beIN Series, formerly DiziMax, is a series of satellite television channels available on Turkish satellite television provider Digiturk. It consists of DiziMax, DiziMax HD, and DiziMaxMore and is available on Sinema Paketi (Cinema Package).
It was one of the international channels to broadcast the finale of Lost, simultaneously with the US broadcast, in HD.

See also 
 beIN Series MENA

External links 
 DiziMax at LyngSat Address
 DiziMax Sci-Fi

Television stations in Turkey